Mamie is a feminine given name and nickname. 

Mamie may also refer to:

 Pierre Mamie (1920–2008), Swiss Roman Catholic bishop
 Mamie (film), a 2016 Canadian short animated film
 Typhoon Mamie (disambiguation), a list of Pacific Ocean typhoons and tropical storms
 Mamie Creek (disambiguation), a stream in Iowa

See also
 Mami (disambiguation)
 Mammy (disambiguation)